Christmas music comprises a variety of genres of music regularly performed or heard around the Christmas season. Music associated with Christmas may be purely instrumental, or, in the case of carols or songs, may employ lyrics whose subject matter ranges from the nativity of Jesus Christ, to gift-giving and merrymaking, to cultural figures such as Santa Claus, among other topics. Many songs simply have a winter or seasonal theme, or have been adopted into the canon for other reasons.

While most Christmas songs prior to 1930 were of a traditional religious character, the Great Depression era of the 1930s brought a stream of songs of American origin, most of which did not explicitly reference the Christian nature of the holiday, but rather the more secular traditional Western themes and customs associated with Christmas. These included songs aimed at children such as "Santa Claus Is Comin' to Town" and "Rudolph the Red-Nosed Reindeer", as well as sentimental ballad-type songs performed by famous crooners of the era, such as "Have Yourself a Merry Little Christmas" and "White Christmas", the latter of which remains the best-selling single of all time as of 2018. Elvis' Christmas Album (1957) by Elvis Presley is the best-selling Christmas album of all time, selling more than 20 million copies worldwide.

Performances of Christmas music at public concerts, in churches, at shopping malls, on city streets, and in private gatherings is an integral staple of the Christmas season in many cultures across the world. Radio stations often convert to a 24-7 Christmas music format leading up to the holiday, starting sometimes as early as the day after Halloween – as part of a phenomenon known as "Christmas creep". Liturgically, Christmas music traditionally ceases to be performed at the arrival of Candlemas, the traditional end of the Christmas-Epiphanytide season.

History

Early music

Music associated with Christmas is thought to have its origins in 4th-century Rome, in Latin-language hymns such as Veni redemptor gentium. By the 13th century, under the influence of Francis of Assisi, the tradition of popular Christmas songs in regional native languages developed. Christmas carols in the English language first appear in a 1426 work of John Awdlay, an English chaplain, who lists twenty five "caroles of Cristemas", probably sung by groups of wassailers who would travel from house to house. In the 16th century, various Christmas carols still sung to this day, including "The 12 Days of Christmas", "God Rest You Merry, Gentlemen", and "O Christmas Tree", first emerged.

Music was an early feature of the Christmas season and its celebrations. The earliest examples are hymnographic works (chants and litanies) intended for liturgical use in observance of both the Feast of the Nativity and Theophany, many of which are still in use by the Eastern Orthodox Church. The 13th century saw the rise of the carol written in the vernacular, under the influence of Francis of Assisi.

In the Middle Ages, the English combined circle dances with singing and called them carols. Later, the word carol came to mean a song in which a religious topic is treated in a style that is familiar or festive. From Italy, it passed to France and Germany, and later to England. Christmas carols in English first appear in a 1426 work of John Audelay, a Shropshire priest and poet, who lists 25 "caroles of Cristemas", probably sung by groups of wassailers, who went from house to house. Music in itself soon became one of the greatest tributes to Christmas, and Christmas music includes some of the noblest compositions of the great musicians. Martin Luther, the father of Lutheran Christianity, encouraged congregational singing during the Mass, in addition to spreading the practice of caroling outside the liturgy.

Puritan prohibition
During the Commonwealth of England government under Cromwell, the Rump Parliament prohibited the practice of singing Christmas carols as Pagan and sinful. Like other customs associated with Christianity of the Catholic and Magisterial Protestant traditions, it earned the disapproval of Puritans. Famously, Cromwell's interregnum prohibited all celebrations of the Christmas holiday. This attempt to ban the public celebration of Christmas can also be seen in the early history of Father Christmas.

The Puritan Westminster Assembly of Divines established Sunday as the only holy day in the liturgical calendar in 1644. The new liturgy produced for the English church recognized this in 1645, and so legally abolished Christmas. Its celebration was declared an offense by Parliament in 1647. There is some debate as to the effectiveness of this ban, and whether or not it was enforced in the country. During the years that the Puritan ban on Christmas was in place in England, semi-clandestine religious services marking Christ's birth continued to be held, and people sang carols in secret.

Puritans generally disapproved of the celebration of Christmas—a trend which continually resurfaced in Europe and the US through the eighteenth, nineteenth and twentieth centuries.

Royal restoration

When in May 1660 Charles II restored the Stuarts to the throne, the people of England once again practiced the public singing of Christmas carols as part of the revival of Christmas customs, sanctioned by the king's own celebrations.

The Victorian Era saw a surge of Christmas carols associated with a renewed admiration of the holiday, including "Silent Night", "O Little Town of Bethlehem", and "O Holy Night". The first Christmas songs associated with Saint Nicholas or other gift-bringers also came during 19th century, including "Up on the Housetop" and "Jolly Old St. Nicholas". Many older Christmas hymns were also translated or had lyrics added to them during this period, particularly in 1871 when John Stainer published a widely influential collection entitled "Christmas Carols New & Old". William Sandys's Christmas Carols Ancient and Modern (1833), contained the first appearance in print of many now-classic English carols, and contributed to the mid-Victorian revival of the holiday. Singing carols in church was instituted on Christmas Eve 1880 (Nine Lessons and Carols) in Truro Cathedral, Cornwall, England, which is now seen in churches all over the world.

According to one of the only observational research studies of Christmas caroling, Christmas observance and caroling traditions vary considerably between nations in the 21st century, while the actual sources and meanings of even high-profile songs are commonly misattributed, and the motivations for carol singing can in some settings be as much associated with family tradition and national cultural heritage as with religious beliefs. Christmas festivities, including music, are also celebrated in a more secular fashion by such institutions as the Santa Claus Village, in Rovaniemi, Finland.

Alms

The tradition of singing Christmas carols in return for alms or charity began in England in the seventeenth century after the Restoration. Town musicians or 'waits' were licensed to collect money in the streets in the weeks preceding Christmas, the custom spread throughout the population by the eighteenth and nineteenth centuries up to the present day. Also from the seventeenth century, there was the English custom, predominantly involving women, of taking a wassail bowl to their neighbors to solicit gifts, accompanied by carols. Despite this long history, many Christmas carols date only from the nineteenth century onwards, with the exception of songs such as the "Wexford Carol", "God Rest You Merry Gentlemen", "As I Sat on a Sunny Bank", "The Holly and the Ivy", the "Coventry Carol" and "I Saw Three Ships". The practice of ordinary Christian church members of various denominations going door to door and singing carols continues in many parts of the world, such as in India; residents give money to the carolers, which churches distribute to the poor.

Church feasts

The importance of Advent and the feast of Christmastide within the church year means there is a large repertoire of music specially composed for performance in church services celebrating the Christmas story. Various composers from the Baroque era to the 21st century have written Christmas cantatas and motets. Some notable compositions include:
 Thomas Tallis: Mass "Puer natus est nobis" (1554)
 Giovanni Pierluigi da Palestrina: O magnum mysterium (1569)
 Orlande de Lassus: Resonet in laudibus (1569)
 Heinrich Schütz: Weihnachtshistorie (1664)
 Johann Sebastian Bach: several cantatas for Christmas to Epiphany and Christmas Oratorio (1734)
 Jakub Jan Ryba: Czech Christmas Mass "Hey, Master!" (1796)
 Anton Bruckner: Virga Jesse floruit (1885)

Classical music

Many large-scale religious compositions are performed in a concert setting at Christmas. Performances of George Frideric Handel's oratorio Messiah are a fixture of Christmas celebrations in some countries, and although it was originally written for performance at Easter, it covers aspects of the Biblical Christmas narrative. Informal Scratch Messiah performances involving public participation are very popular in the Christmas season. Johann Sebastian Bach's Christmas Oratorio, written for Christmas 1734, describes the birth of Jesus, the annunciation to the shepherds, the adoration of the shepherds, the circumcision and naming of Jesus, the journey of the Magi, and the adoration of the Magi. Antonio Vivaldi composed the Violin Concerto RV270 "Il Riposo per il Santissimo Natale" ("For the Most Holy Christmas"). Arcangelo Corelli composed the Christmas Concerto in 1690. Peter Cornelius composed a cycle of six songs related to Christmas themes he called Weihnachtslieder. Setting his own poems for solo voice and piano, he alluded to older Christmas carols in the accompaniment of two of the songs.

Other classical works associated with Christmas include:

 Marc-Antoine Charpentier, 9 vocal settings and 2 instrumental settings :
 Messe de Minuit H.9 for soloists, choir, flûtes, strings and bc (1690)
 In nativitatem Domini canticum H.314 for 4 voices, 2 flutes, 2 violins and bc (1670)
 Canticum in nativitatem Domini H.393 for 3 voies, 2 treeble instruments and bc (1675)
 Pastorale de Noël H.414 for soloists, choir, 2 treeble instruments and bc (1683-85)
 Oratorio de Noël H.416 for soloists, choir, flutes, strings and bc (1690)
 Dialogus inter angelos et pastores Judae in nativitatem Domini H.420 for soloists, choir, flutes, strings and bc (1695?)
 In nativitate Domini Nostri Jesu Christi canticum H.421 for 3 voices and bc (1698-99)
 Pastorale de Noël H.482 for soloists, choir, 2 treeble viols and bc (1683-85)
 Pastorale de Noël H.483 H.483 a H.483 b for soloists, choir, 2 flutes, 2 treeble viols and bc (1683-85)
 Noël pour les instruments H.531 for flutes, strings and bc (1688?)
 Noël sur les instruments H.534 for flutes, strings and bc (1698)

 Christus (1847) an unfinished oratorio by Felix Mendelssohn
 L'enfance du Christ (1853–54) by Hector Berlioz
 Oratorio de Noël (1858) by Camille Saint-Saëns
 The Nutcracker (1892) by Pyotr Ilyich Tchaikovsky
 Fantasia on Christmas Carols (1912) and Hodie (1954), both by Ralph Vaughan Williams
 A Ceremony of Carols (1942) by Benjamin Britten.

Christmas carols

Songs which are traditional, even some without a specific religious context, are often called Christmas carols. Each of these has a rich history, some dating back many centuries.

Standards
A popular set of traditional carols that might be heard at any Christmas-related event include:

 "Angels We Have Heard on High" (in the UK the text of "Angels from the Realms of Glory" is sung to this tune)
 "Away in a Manger"
 "Deck the Halls"
 "Ding Dong Merrily on High"
 "The First Noel"
 "Go Tell It on the Mountain"
 "God Rest You Merry, Gentlemen"
 "Good King Wenceslas"
 "Hark! The Herald Angels Sing"
 "I Saw Three Ships"
 "It Came Upon the Midnight Clear"
 "Joy to the World"
 "O Christmas Tree" (O Tannenbaum)
 "O Come, All Ye Faithful" (Adeste Fideles)
 "O come, O come, Emmanuel"
 "O Holy Night" (Cantique de Noël)
 "O Little Town of Bethlehem"
 "Once in Royal David's City"
 "Silent Night" (Stille Nacht, heilige Nacht)
 "The Twelve Days of Christmas"
 "We Three Kings of Orient Are"
 "We Wish You a Merry Christmas" 
 "What Child Is This?"
 "While Shepherds Watched Their Flocks"

These songs hearken from centuries ago, the oldest ("Wexford Carol") originating in the 12th century. The newest came together in the mid- to late-19th century. Many began in non-English speaking countries, often with non-Christmas themes, and were later converted into English carols with English lyrics added—not always translated from the original, but newly created—sometimes as late as the early 20th century.

Early secular Christmas songs

Among the earliest secular Christmas songs was "The Twelve Days of Christmas", which first appeared in 1780 in England (its melody would not come until 1909); the English West Country carol "We Wish You a Merry Christmas" has antecedents dating to the 1830s but was not published in its modern form until Arthur Warrell introduced it to a wider audience in 1935. As the secular mythos of the holiday (such as Santa Claus in his modern form) emerged in the 19th century, so too did secular Christmas songs. Benjamin Hanby's "Up on the House Top" and Emily Huntington Miller's "Jolly Old Saint Nicholas" were among the first explicitly secular Christmas songs in the United States, both dating to the 1860s; they were preceded by "Jingle Bells", written in 1857 but not explicitly about Christmas, and "O Christmas Tree," written in 1824 but only made about a Christmas tree after being translated from its original German.

Published Christmas music

Christmas music has been published as sheet music for centuries. One of the earliest collections of printed Christmas music was Piae Cantiones, a Finnish songbook first published in 1582 which contained a number of songs that have survived today as well-known Christmas carols. The publication of Christmas music books in the 19th century, such as Christmas Carols, New and Old (Bramley and Stainer, 1871), played an important role in widening the popular appeal of carols. In the 20th century, Oxford University Press (OUP) published some highly successful Christmas music collections such as The Oxford Book of Carols (Martin Shaw, Ralph Vaughan Williams and Percy Dearmer, 1928), which revived a number of early folk songs and established them as modern standard carols. This was followed by the bestselling Carols for Choirs series (David Willcocks, Reginald Jacques and John Rutter), first published in 1961 and now available in a five volumes. The popular books have proved to be a popular resource for choirs and church congregations in the English-speaking world, and remain in print today.

 Christmas Carols, New and Old (1871)
 Oxford Book of Carols (1928)
 Carols for Choirs (1961)
 New Oxford Book of Carols (1992)
 A Shorter New Oxford Book of Carols (1992)

Choirmasters poll
In 2008, BBC Music Magazine published a poll of the "50 Greatest Carols", compiled from the views of choral experts and choirmasters in the UK and the US. The resulting list of the top ten favored Christmas carols and motets was:

 "In the Bleak Midwinter" – Harold Darke
 "In Dulci Jubilo" – traditional
 "A Spotless Rose" – Herbert Howells
 "Bethlehem Down" – Peter Warlock
 "Lully, Lulla" – traditional
 "Tomorrow Shall Be My Dancing Day"
 "There Is No Rose" - traditional (15th c.)
 "O Come, All Ye Faithful"
 "Of the Father's Heart Begotten"
 "What Sweeter Music" – John Rutter

Popular Christmas songs

United States

According to the American Society of Composers, Authors and Publishers (ASCAP) in 2016, "Santa Claus Is Coming to Town", written by Fred Coots and Haven Gillespie in 1934, is the most played holiday song of the last 50 years. It was first performed live by Eddie Cantor on his radio show in November 1934. Tommy Dorsey and his orchestra recorded their version in 1935, followed later by a range of artists including Frank Sinatra in 1948, the Supremes, the Jackson 5, the Beach Boys, and Glenn Campbell. Bruce Springsteen recorded a rock rendition in December 1975.

Long-time Christmas classics from prior to the "rock era" still dominate the holiday charts – such as "Let It Snow! Let It Snow! Let It Snow!", "Winter Wonderland", "Sleigh Ride" and "Have Yourself a Merry Little Christmas". Songs from the rock era to enter the top tier of the season's canon include "Wonderful Christmastime" by Paul McCartney, "All I Want for Christmas Is You" by Mariah Carey and Walter Afanasieff, and "Last Christmas" by George Michael.

The most popular set of these titles—heard over airwaves, on the internet, in shopping malls, in elevators and lobbies, even on the street during the Christmas season—have been composed and performed from the 1930s onward. (Songs published before 1925 are all out of copyright, are no longer subject to ASCAP royalties and thus do not appear on their list.) In addition to Bing Crosby, major acts that have popularized and successfully covered a number of the titles in the top 30 most performed Christmas songs in 2015 include Frank Sinatra, Elvis Presley, Andy Williams, and the Jackson 5.

Since the mid-1950s, much of the Christmas music produced for popular audiences has explicitly romantic overtones, only using Christmas as a setting. The 1950s also featured the introduction of novelty songs that used the holiday as a target for satire and source for comedy. Exceptions such as "The Christmas Shoes" (2000) have re-introduced Christian themes as complementary to the secular Western themes, and myriad traditional carol cover versions by various artists have explored virtually all music genres.

Most-performed Christmas songs 

The top thirty most-played holiday songs for the 2015 holiday season are ranked here, all titles written or co-written by ASCAP songwriters and composers.

Most of these songs in some way describe or are reminiscent of Christmas traditions, how Western Christian countries tend to celebrate the holiday, i.e., with caroling, mistletoe, exchanging of presents, a Christmas tree, feasting, jingle bells, etc. Celebratory or sentimental, and nostalgic in tone, they hearken back to simpler times with memorable holiday practices—expressing the desire either to be with someone or at home for Christmas. The winter-related songs celebrate the climatic season, with all its snow, dressing up for the cold, sleighing, etc.

Many titles help define the mythical aspects of modern Christmas celebration: Santa Claus bringing presents, coming down the chimney, being pulled by reindeer, etc. New mythical characters are created, defined, and popularized by these songs; "Rudolph the Red-Nosed Reindeer", adapted from a major retailer's promotional poem, was introduced to radio audiences by Gene Autry in 1949. His follow-up a year later introduced "Frosty the Snowman", the central character of his song. Though overtly religious, and authored (at least partly) by a writer of many church hymns, no drumming child appears in any biblical account of the Christian nativity scene. This character was introduced to the tradition by Katherine K. Davis in her "The Little Drummer Boy" (written in 1941, with a popular version being released in 1958). Loretta Lynn introduced "Shadrack, the Black Reindeer" in 1974.

The above-ranking results from an aggregation of performances of all different artist versions of each cited holiday song, across all forms of media, from January 1, 2015, through December 31, 2015.
 Of the top 30 most performed Christmas songs in 2015, 13 (43%) were written in the 1930s or 1940s and 12 (40%) were written in the 1950s and 1960s; only five (17%) were written from the 1970s on, two (7%) were from after 1990, and none after 1995. This phenomenon was noted in the webcomic xkcd and referred to as "a massive project to carefully recreate...baby boomers’ childhoods".
 The newest song in the top 30 most performed Christmas songs – "All I Want for Christmas is You", co-written and performed by Mariah Carey in 1994 – entered the list for the first time in 2015; the song hit the Billboard Hot 100 top 10 for the first time in 2017, and was named "the UK's favourite Christmas song" the same year by The Independent. Troy Powers and Andy Stone wrote a song with the same title and theme, which Vince Vance & the Valiants recorded in 1989 and independently became popular at the same time as Carey's song. The melody is similar to Bobby Vinton's "My Heart Belongs to Only You".
 Johnny Marks wrote three songs that appear in these most-performed Christmas songs in 2015: "Rudolph the Red-Nosed Reindeer", "Holly Jolly Christmas", and "Rockin' Around the Christmas Tree". Irving Berlin wrote two: "White Christmas" and "Happy Holiday". These are the only songwriters to appear on the list more than once – and both are non-Christian.
 Gene Autry was the first to sing three songs on the list of top 30 most performed Christmas songs in 2015 – "Rudolph the Red-Nosed Reindeer", "Frosty the Snowman", and "Here Comes Santa Claus (Right Down Santa Claus Lane)" – co-writing the latter song.
 Two of the songs, "Carol of the Bells" and "Christmas Eve/Sarajevo 12/24", rely on the same melody, Mykola Leontovych's "Shchedryk", which was published in 1918 and is thus out of copyright, no longer subject to ASCAP royalties. The lyrics to "Carol of the Bells" are still under copyright. The copyright on "Christmas Eve/Sarajevo 12/24" extends only to the arrangement.

Christmas song surveys
In 2007 surveys of United States radio listeners by two different research groups, the most liked songs were standards such as Bing Crosby's "White Christmas" (1942), Nat King Cole's "The Christmas Song" (1946), and Burl Ives' "A Holly Jolly Christmas" (1965). Other favorites like "Rockin' Around the Christmas Tree" (Brenda Lee, 1958), "Jingle Bell Rock" (Bobby Helms, 1957) and John Lennon and Yoko Ono's "Happy Xmas" (1971), scored well in one study. Also "loved" were Johnny Mathis' "Do You Hear What I Hear?" and Harry Simeone Chorale's "Little Drummer Boy" (1958).

Among the most-hated Christmas songs, according to Edison Media Research's 2007 survey, are Barbra Streisand's "Jingle Bells?", the Jackson 5's "Santa Claus Is Coming to Town", Elmo & Patsy's "Grandma Got Run Over by a Reindeer", and "O Holy Night" as performed by cartoon characters from Comedy Central's South Park. The "most-hated Christmastime recording" is a rendition of "Jingle Bells" by Carl Weissmann's Singing Dogs, a revolutionary novelty song originally released in 1955, and re-released as an edited version in 1970.

Rolling Stone magazine ranked Darlene Love's version of "Christmas (Baby Please Come Home)" (1963) first on its list of The Greatest Rock and Roll Christmas Songs in December 2010. Carey's "All I Want for Christmas Is You", co-written by Carey and Walter Afanasieff, was No. 1 on Billboard's Holiday Digital Songs chart in December 2013. "Fairytale of New York" by The Pogues is cited as the best Christmas song of all time in various television, radio and magazine related polls in the United Kingdom and Ireland.

A 2021 YouGov survey of 1,000 adults ranked the most hated Christmas songs, counting only those songs that a majority of those polls recognized and listing the songs independent of any artist who may have recorded them. "Santa Baby" ranked atop the list; a side note from a news article covering the list noted that much of that hatred came from the Madonna cover version from A Very Special Christmas, which gets more airplay than Eartha Kitt's original. Other songs that ranked high in terms of listener revulsion included "I Saw Mommy Kissing Santa Claus," "Grandma Got Run Over by a Reindeer" and "Wonderful Christmastime."

Pinnacle Media Worldwide survey 
The Pinnacle Media Worldwide survey divided its listeners into music-type categories:

 "Adult contemporary" listeners rated Brenda Lee's "Rockin' Around the Christmas Tree" best.
 "Adult Top 40" fans liked Bobby Helms' "Jingle Bell Rock".
 "Hip-hop/R&B" fans liked the Jackson 5's "Santa Claus Is Coming to Town".
 "Country" listeners ranked Burl Ives' "A Holly Jolly Christmas" No. 1.
 "Smooth jazz" fans liked "The Christmas Song" as sung by Nat King Cole.

United Kingdom and Ireland

Most played songs

A collection of chart hits recorded in a bid to be crowned the UK Christmas No. 1 single during the 1970s and 1980s have become some of the most popular holiday tunes in the United Kingdom. Band Aid's 1984 song "Do They Know It's Christmas?" is the second-best selling single in UK Chart history. "Fairytale of New York", released by The Pogues in 1987, is regularly voted the British public's favourite-ever Christmas song. It is also the most-played Christmas song of the 21st century in the UK. British glam rock bands had major hit singles with Christmas songs in the 1970s. "Merry Xmas Everybody" by Slade, "I Wish It Could Be Christmas Everyday" by Wizzard, and "Lonely This Christmas" by Mud all remain hugely popular.

In 2012, PRS for Music (who collect and pay royalties to its 75,000 song-writing and composing members) conducted a survey of the top ten most played Christmas songs in the UK over the past year. The list was as follows:

Included in the 2009 and 2008 lists are such other titles as Jona Lewie's "Stop the Cavalry", Bruce Springsteen's "Santa Claus is Coming to Town", Elton John's "Step into Christmas", Mud's "Lonely This Christmas", "Walking in the Air" by Aled Jones, Shakin' Stevens' "Merry Christmas Everyone", Chris Rea's "Driving Home for Christmas" and "Mistletoe and Wine" and "Saviour's Day" by Cliff Richard.

The best Christmas song "to get adults and children in the festive spirit for the party season in 2016" was judged by the Daily Mirror to be "Fairytale of New York". Mariah Carey's "All I Want For Christmas is You" was declared "the UK's favourite Christmas song", narrowly beating out "Fairytale of New York" according to a "points system" created by The Independent in 2017. Both score well ahead of all others on the list of top twenty Christmas songs in the UK.

Christmas Number Ones

The "Christmas Number One" – songs reaching the top spot on either the UK Singles Chart, the Irish Singles Chart, or occasionally both, on the edition preceding Christmas – is considered a major achievement in the United Kingdom and Ireland. The Christmas number one benefits from broad publicity, so much so that the songs that attempt but fail to achieve the honor and finish second also get widespread attention. Social media campaigns have been used to try to encourage sales of specific songs so that they could reach number one.

These songs develop an association with Christmas or the holiday season from their chart performance, but the association tends to be shorter-lived than for the more traditionally-themed Christmas songs. Notable longer-lasting examples include Band Aid's "Do They Know It's Christmas?" (No. 1, 1984, the second-biggest selling single in UK Chart history; two re-recordings also hit No. 1 in 1989 and 2004), Slade's "Merry Xmas Everybody" (No. 1, 1973), and Wham!'s "Last Christmas" (No. 2, 1984). Last Christmas would go on to hold the UK record for highest-selling single not to reach No. 1, until it finally topped the chart on January 1, 2021, helped by extensive streaming in the final week of December 2020.

The Beatles, Spice Girls, and LadBaby are the only artists to have achieved consecutive Christmas number-one hits on the UK Singles Chart, with LadBaby the only artist to have four consecutive Christmas number-ones. The Beatles annually between 1963 and 1965 (with a fourth in 1967), the Spice Girls between 1996 and 1998, and LadBaby between 2018 and 2021 (all four of LadBaby's Christmas number-ones were parodies of other popular songs that included a running gag mentioning sausage rolls). "Bohemian Rhapsody" is the only recording to have ever been Christmas number one twice, in both 1975 and 1991. Three of the four different Band Aid recordings of "Do They Know It's Christmas?" have been number one in Christmas week.

At the turn of the 21st century, songs associated with reality shows became a frequent source of Christmas number ones in the UK. In 2002, Popstars: The Rivals produced the top three singles on the British Christmas charts. The "rival" groups produced by the series—the girl group Girls Aloud and the boy band One True Voice—finished first and second respectively on the charts. Failed contestants The Cheeky Girls charted with a novelty hit, "Cheeky Song (Touch My Bum)", at third. Briton Will Young, winner of the first Pop Idol, charted at the top of the Irish charts in 2003.

The X Factor also typically concluded in December during its run; the winner's debut single earned the Christmas number one in at least one of the two countries every year from 2005 to 2014, and in both countries in five of those ten years. Each year since 2008 has seen protest campaigns to outsell the X Factor single (which benefits from precisely-timed release and corresponding media buzz) and prevent it from reaching number one. In 2009, as the result of a campaign intended to counter the phenomenon, Rage Against the Machine's 1992 single "Killing in the Name" reached number one in the UK instead of that year's X Factor winner, Joe McElderry. In 2011, "Wherever You Are", the single from a choir of military wives assembled by the TV series The Choir, earned the Christmas number-one single in Britain—upsetting X Factor winners Little Mix. With the Military Wives Choir single not being released in Ireland, Little Mix won Christmas number-one in Ireland that year.

Australia 
Situated in the southern hemisphere, where seasons are reversed from the northern, the heat of early summer in Australia affects the way Christmas is celebrated and how northern hemisphere Christmas traditions are followed. Australians generally spend Christmas outdoors, going to the beach for the day, or heading to campgrounds for a vacation. International visitors to Sydney at Christmastime often go to Bondi Beach where tens of thousands gather on Christmas Day.

The tradition of an Australian Christmas Eve carol service lit by candles, started in 1937 by Victorian radio announcer Norman Banks, has taken place in Melbourne annually since then. Carols by Candlelight events can be "huge gatherings . . televised live throughout the country" or smaller "local community and church events." Carols in the Domain in Sydney is now a "popular platform for the stars of stage and music."

Some homegrown Christmas songs have become popular. William G. James' six sets of Australian Christmas Carols, with words by John Wheeler, include "The Three Drovers", "The Silver Stars are in the Sky", "Christmas Day", "Carol of the Birds" and others. "Light-hearted Australian Christmas songs" have become "an essential part of the Australian Christmas experience." Rolf Harris' "Six White Boomers", Colin Buchanan's "Aussie Jingle Bells", and the "Australian Twelve Days of Christmas", proudly proclaim the differing traditions Down Under. A verse from "Aussie Jingle Bells" makes the point:
Engine's getting hot
Dodge the kangaroos
Swaggie climbs aboard
He is welcome too
All the family is there
Sitting by the pool
Christmas Day, the Aussie way
By the barbecue!

"The Twelve Days of Christmas" has been revised to fit the Australian context, as an example: "On the twelfth day of Christmas, my true love sent to me: 12 parrots prattling, 11 numbats nagging, 10 lizards leaping, 9 wombats working, 8 dingoes digging, 7 possums playing, 6 brolgas dancing, 5 kangaroos, 4 koalas cuddling, 3 kookaburras laughing, 2 pink galahs, and an emu up a gum tree."

Other popular Australian Christmas songs include: 'White Wine in the Sun" by Tim Minchin, "Aussie Jingle Bells" by Bucko & Champs, "Christmas Photo" by John Williamson, "Go Santa, Go" by The Wiggles, and "Six White Boomers" by Russel Coight.

"My Little Christmas Belle" (1909) composed by Joe Slater (1872-1926) to words by Ward McAlister (1872–1928) celebrates eastern Australian flora coming into bloom during the heat of Christmas. Blandfordia nobilis, also known as Christmas Bells, are the specific subject of the song—with the original sheet music bearing a depiction of the blossom. Whereas "The Holly and The Ivy" (1937) by Australian Louis Lavater (1867–1953) mentions northern hemisphere foliage.

Australian singer-songwriter Paul Kelly first released "How to Make Gravy" as part of a four-track EP November 4, 1996, through White Label Records. The title track, written by Kelly, tells the story in a letter to his brother from a newly imprisoned man who laments how he will be missing the family Christmas. It received a Song of the Year nomination at the 1998 Australasian Performing Right Association (APRA) Music Awards. Kelly's theme reflects a national experience with Christmas:

Other popular Christmas songs
"Jolly Old Saint Nicholas" originated with a poem by Emily Huntington Miller (1833-1913), published as "Lilly's Secret" in The Little Corporal Magazine December 1865. Lyrics have also been attributed to Benjamin Hanby, who wrote Up on the Housetop in 1864, but the words commonly heard today resemble Miller's 1865 poem. James R. Murray is attributed as composer in the first publication of the music in School Chimes, A New School Music Book by S. Brainard's Sons in 1874. Early notable recordings were made by Ray Smith (1949), Chet Atkins (1961), Eddy Arnold (1962), and Alvin and the Chipmunks (1963).

"I've Got My Love to Keep Me Warm", introduced in the musical film On the Avenue by Dick Powell and Alice Faye in 1937, was written by Irving Berlin. "The Little Boy that Santa Claus Forgot" – written by Michael Carr, Tommie Connor, and Jimmy Leach in 1937 – was notably performed by Vera Lynn and Nat King Cole. "I'll Be Home for Christmas", by lyricist Kim Gannon and composer Walter Kent, was recorded by Bing Crosby in 1943. "Merry Christmas Baby" is credited to Lou Baxter and Johnny Moore, whose group originally recorded it in 1947, featuring singer and pianist Charles Brown. Kay Thompson introduced her "The Holiday Season" in 1945, which later became part of a medley by Andy Williams. "A Marshmallow World" (sometimes called "It's a Marshmallow World") was written in 1949 by Carl Sigman (lyrics) and Peter DeRose (music).

More popular songs which reference the Nativity include "I Wonder as I Wander" (1933), "Mary's Boy Child" (1956), "Carol of the Drum" ("Little Drummer Boy") (1941), and "Do You Hear What I Hear?" (1962).

Other titles and recordings added to the popular Christmas song canon include:

1950s 

 1950: "(Everybody's Waitin' for) The Man with the Bag", written by Irving Taylor and Dudley Brooks; popularized by Kay Starr.
 1950: "Dixieland Band from Santa Claus Land" by Jimmy Dorsey and his orchestra.
 1950: "A Marshmallow World", written by Carl Sigman and Peter DeRose; released by Bing Crosby (backed by The Lee Gordon Singers and the Sonny Burke Orchestra).
 1950: "Mele Kalikimaka"; written in 1949 by R. Alex Anderson; released by Bing Crosby and The Andrews Sisters as a single (with "Poppa Santa Claus" on the reverse side). The title is the closest approximation of the pronunciation of "Merry Christmas" possible in the Hawaiian language.
 1951: "Christmas Choir", released by Patti Page on Christmas with Patti Page.
 1951: "Suzy Snowflake", written by Sid Tepper and Roy C. Bennett; released by Rosemary Clooney as a 78 RPM record through Columbia Records.
 1953: "Up on the Housetop", written by Benjamin Hanby in 1864; popularized by Gene Autry.
 1954: "The Christmas Waltz", written by Sammy Cahn and Jule Styne; released by Frank Sinatra on the B-side of his version of "White Christmas" and later A Jolly Christmas from Frank Sinatra (1957) and The Sinatra Family Wish You a Merry Christmas (1968).
 1955: "The First Snowfall" written by Paul Francis Webster, Sonny Burke and recorded by Bing Crosby on November 22, 1955.
 1956: "I Heard the Bells on Christmas Day", written by Johnny Marks from a Christmas carol based on the 1863 poem "Christmas Bells" by Henry Wadsworth Longfellow; released by Bing Crosby as a single (with "Christmas Is A-Comin' (May God Bless You)" on B-side).
 1956: "Mary's Boy Child", written by Jester Hairston; released by Harry Belafonte on An Evening with Belafonte.
 1957: "Mistletoe and Holly" written by Frank Sinatra, Dok Stanford, and Hank Sanicola; recorded by Sinatra with orchestra conducted by Gordon Jenkins, released as a Capitol 7" 45 single backed with "The Christmas Waltz". Included on A Jolly Christmas From Frank Sinatra.
 1958: "Run Rudolph Run", written by Johnny Marks and Marvin Brodie; popularized by Chuck Berry when released as a single on Chess Records.
 1959: "Caroling, Caroling", written by Alfred Burt in 1953; recorded by Fred Waring on The Sounds of Christmas.
 1959: "The Secret of Christmas", written by Sammy Cahn and Jimmy Van Heusen for Bing Crosby, first performed in the film Say One for Me; Crosby recorded the song with an arrangement by Frank DeVol for a single that year released by Columbia Records.

1960s

 1960: "Caroling, Caroling", written by Alfred Burt in 1953; popularized by Nat King Cole on The Magic of Christmas.
 1960: "Please Come Home for Christmas", written by Charles Brown and Gene Redd; released by Brown on Charles Brown Sings Christmas Songs (since becoming associated with the Eagles' 1978 cover).
 1960: "Must Be Santa", written by Hal Moore and Bill Fredericks; first released by Mitch Miller; Tommy Steele's cover of the song reaching No. 40 on the UK Singles Chart the same year.
 1960: "Dominick the Donkey" written by Ray Allen, Wandra Merrell, and Sam Saltzberg; recorded by Lou Monte on Roulette Records. The song describes a donkey who helps Santa Claus bring presents ("made in Brooklyn") to children in Italy "because the reindeer cannot climb" Italy's hills.
 1961: "The Merriest", "Ring a Merry Bell" and "Seven Shades of Snow", all written by Connie Pearce and Arnold Miller; released by June Christy on This Time of Year.
 1961: "We Wish You the Merriest", written and recorded by Les Brown; released by Frank Sinatra, Bing Crosby, and Fred Waring's Pennsylvanians on 12 Songs of Christmas in 1964.
 1963: "Christmas (Baby Please Come Home)", written by Ellie Greenwich, Jeff Barry with Phil Spector; released by Darlene Love on A Christmas Gift for You from Phil Spector.
 1963: "Happy Holidays/The Holiday Season" medley by Andy Williams of Irving Berlin's 1942 classic with Kay Thompson's "The Holiday Season" from 1945.
 1963: "Little Saint Nick", written by Brian Wilson and Mike Love; released by the Beach Boys as a single and included on The Beach Boys' Christmas Album in 1964.
 1963: "Pretty Paper" by Willie Nelson; sung by Roy Orbison. Nelson had a hit with his own song in 1978.
 1964: "Silver and Gold", written by Johnny Marks; sung by Burl Ives on the Rankin-Bass Christmas special Rudolph the Red-Nosed Reindeer.
 1964: "Toyland" written by Victor Herbert and Glen McDonough for the operetta Babes in Toyland (originally produced in 1903); released by Doris Day on The Doris Day Christmas Album.
 1964: "Snowfall", written by Claude Thornhill in 1941, with lyrics later added by his wife, Ruth Thornhill; covered by Doris Day on The Doris Day Christmas Album.
 1965: "Christmas Time Is Here", written for A Charlie Brown Christmas animated TV special; harmonized by the choir of St. Paul's Episcopal Church in San Rafael, California.
 1965: "My Favorite Things", written by Richard Rodgers and Oscar Hammerstein for the 1959 musical, The Sound of Music; covered by Diana Ross and the Supremes on Merry Christmas.
 1965: "Santa Looked a Lot Like Daddy", written by Buck Owens and Don Rich; released by Owens as single with "All I Want for Christmas, Dear, Is You" on the B-side.
 1966: "We Need a Little Christmas" written by Jerry Herman for the Broadway musical Mame, and first performed by Angela Lansbury in that 1966 production; popularly covered by Percy Faith & His Orchestra on Christmas Is... Percy Faith.
 1966: "The Happiest Christmas Tree", written by Cathy Lynn; recorded by Nat King Cole.
 1967: "Snoopy's Christmas", written by George David Weiss and Hugo & Luigi; released by the Royal Guardsmen on Snoopy and His Friends.
 1967: "What Christmas Means to Me" written by Allen Story, Anna Gordy Gaye, and George Gordy; recorded by Stevie Wonder on Someday at Christmas.

1970s

 1970: "Give Love on Christmas Day", written by The Corporation (Berry Gordy, Alphonzo Mizell, Christine Perren, Freddie Perren, and Deke Richards); recorded by the Jackson 5 for The Jackson 5 Christmas Album.
 1970: "Merry Christmas Darling", written by Richard Carpenter with lyrics by Frank Pooler; released by The Carpenters as a single (re-released 1974 & 1977); remixed on Christmas Portrait in 1978 with new vocal by Karen Carpenter.
 1970: "This Christmas", written by Donny Hathaway (as "Donny Pitts") and Nadine Theresa McKinnor; recorded by Hathaway and released as a single (with "Be There" on the B-side).
 1971: "My Christmas Card To You" released by The Partridge Family on A Partridge Family Christmas Card.
 1971: "River" written by Joni Mitchell; released by her on Blue.
 1973: "Step into Christmas", written by Elton John and Bernie Taupin; released by John as a stand-alone single.
 1974: "I Believe in Father Christmas" written by Greg Lake with lyrics by Peter Sinfield; released by Lake as a single (with "Humbug" on B-side). Instrumental riff between verses interpolated from "Troika" portion of Sergei Prokofiev's Lieutenant Kijé Suite, written for 1934 Soviet film, Lieutenant Kijé
 1976: "When a Child is Born" (original melody titled "Soleado"), written by Ciro Dammicco (alias "Zacar") and Dario Baldan Bembo in 1973 (English language lyrics written later by Fred Jay); released by Johnny Mathis as single entitled "When A Child Is Born (Soleado)" with "Every Time You Touch Me (I Get High)" on the B-side.
 1977: "Celebrate Me Home", written by Kenny Loggins and Bob James; recorded by Loggins as title track of his debut solo album Celebrate Me Home.
 1977: "Father Christmas", written by Ray Davies; released by The Kinks as a single (with "Prince of the Punks" on B-side).
 1977: "Peace on Earth/Little Drummer Boy", "The Little Drummer Boy" written in 1941 by Katherine Kennicott Davis; "Peace on Earth" written by Ian Fraser, Larry Grossman, and Alan Kohan; medley recorded by David Bowie and Bing Crosby for the television special, Bing Crosby's Merrie Olde Christmas. (Bowie single released 1982.)
 1978: "Mary's Boy Child – Oh My Lord", written by Jester Hairston in 1956 with new song by Frank Farian, Fred Jay, and Hela Lorin; medley released by Boney M as a single.
 1978: "Please Come Home for Christmas", written by Charles Brown and Gene Redd in 1960; cover released by The Eagles as a single (with "Funky New Year" on B-side) 
 1979: "Grandma Got Run Over by a Reindeer"; written by Randy Brooks; released by Elmo & Patsy as a single (with "Christmas" on B-side).

1980s

 1980: "It Must Have Been The Mistletoe (Our First Christmas)", written by Doug Konecky and Justin Wilde; released by Barbara Mandrell on Christmas at Our House.
 1980: "Same Old Lang Syne", written by Dan Fogelberg; released as a single by Folgelberg in 1980 (with "Hearts and Crafts" on B-side). It was included on his 1981 album The Innocent Age.
 1980: "Stop The Cavalry" written by Jona Lewie; released by Lewie as a single (with "Laughing Tonight" on B-side).
 1981: "Christmas is the Time to Say 'I Love You'" written by Billy Squier; released by him by as the B-side of his hit, "My Kinda Lover".
 1981: "Christmas Wrapping", written by Chris Butler; released by The Waitresses as a single (with "Christmas Fever" by Charlelie Couture on B-side). Also included in a Christmas compilation album.
 1982: "Hard Candy Christmas"; written by Carol Hall for the musical, The Best Little Whorehouse in Texas; released by Dolly Parton as a single (with "Act Like a Fool" on B-side).
 1984: "Thank God It's Christmas", written by Brian May and Roger Taylor; released by Queen as a single (with "Man on the Prowl" and "Keep Passing the Open Windows" on B-side).
 1984: "Another Lonely Christmas", written by Prince; released by Prince and the Revolution as a single.
 1984: "The Power of Love", written by Holly Johnson, Peter Gill, Mark O'Toole, and Brian Nash; released by Frankie Goes to Hollywood as a single (with "The World Is My Oyster" on B-side).
 1985: "Merry Christmas Everyone"; written by Bob Heatlie; released by Shakin' Stevens as a single (with "With My Heart" and "Blue Christmas" on B-side).
 1985: "There's a New Kid in Town", written by Don Cook, Curly Putman, and Keith Whitley.
 1987: "Christmas in Hollis", written by Joseph Simmons, Darryl McDaniels, and Jason Mizell; released by Run D.M.C. on two Christmas compilation albums: A Very Special Christmas and Christmas Rap, and as a single (with "Peter Piper" on B-side).
 1988: "Driving Home for Christmas"; written by Chris Rea; originally released as one of two new songs on Rea's first compilation album New Light Through Old Windows in October, then issued as the fourth single from the album in December.
 1988: "Mistletoe and Wine", written by Jeremy Paul, Leslie Stewart and Keith Strachan for the 1976 musical, Scraps (an adaptation of Hans Christian Andersen's "The Little Match Girl"); released by Cliff Richard as a single (with "Marmaduke" on B-side), and on his album Private Collection: 1979–1988.
 1989: "All I Want for Christmas Is You", written by Troy Powers and Andy Stone; released by Vince Vance & The Valiants as a single.
 1989: "Merry Christmas (I Don't Want to Fight Tonight)" by The Ramones on their Brain Drain album.

1990s

 1990: "Saviour's Day", written by Chris Eaton; released by Cliff Richard as a single (with "Where You Are" on B-side).
 1990: "Grown-Up Christmas List", written by David Foster, Linda Thompson-Jenner, and Amy Grant; released by David Foster with Natalie Cole for his album River of Love (with a 1992 version by Amy Grant).
 1991: "Mary, Did You Know?", with lyrics written by Mark Lowry (in 1984) and music by Buddy Greene; originally recorded by Michael English on a self-titled album (with a 1996 version by Kenny Rogers and Wynona Judd).
 1992: "All Alone on Christmas", written and arranged by Steve Van Zandt; recorded by Darlene Love as a single with members of The E Street Band and The Miami Horns. Originally featured on Home Alone 2: Lost in New York soundtrack.
 1992: "Christmas All Over Again" by Tom Petty and the Heartbreakers on the album box set Playback
 1993: "Hey Santa!", written (with the help of Jack Kugell) and sung by Carnie and Wendy Wilson on the album of the same name.
 1994: "The Chanukah Song"; written by Adam Sandler, Lewis Morton, and Ian Maxtone-Graham; originally performed by Sandler on Saturday Night Live's Weekend Update segment on December 3, 1994. Released as a single by Sandler in 1995 from What the Hell Happened to Me?. 
 1996: "How to Make Gravy" written and performed by Paul Kelly in Australia.
 1998: "Christmas Canon" by the Trans-Siberian Orchestra on their album The Christmas Attic
 1998: "Merry Christmas, Happy Holidays" by NSYNC from the albums Home for Christmas and The Winter Album

2000s

 2000: "My Only Wish (This Year)" by Britney Spears off the compilation album, Platinum Christmas
 2000: "Where Are You, Christmas?" co-written by Mariah Carey, James Horner, and Will Jennings, but recorded by Faith Hill. The song was originally recorded by Carey, but because of a legal case with her ex-husband Tommy Mottola, it could not be released, so it was re-recorded and released by Faith Hill.
 2002: "Maybe This Christmas" by Ron Sexsmith from the compilation album of the same name.
 2003: "Christmas Time (Don't Let the Bells End)" by The Darkness
 2004: "Believe" written by Glen Ballard and Alan Silvestri for Josh Groban
2004: "Joseph's Lullaby" by MercyMe from the album The Christmas Sessions
 2004: "Wizards in Winter", an instrumental written and composed by Paul O'Neill and Robert Kinkel, performed by the Trans-Siberian Orchestra
 2007: "Mistletoe" written by Stacy Blue and Colbie Caillat, and performed by Caillat.
 2008: "White Is in the Winter Night" by Enya on the album, And Winter Came...
 2009: "It Doesn't Often Snow at Christmas" by Pet Shop Boys (UK No. 40 hit)

2010s

 2010: "Oh Santa!" by Mariah Carey from her album Merry Christmas II You. A new version, featuring Ariana Grande and Jennifer Hudson, was released in 2020 for the Mariah Carey's Magical Christmas Special's soundtrack.
 2010: "Christmas Lights" by Coldplay
 2010: "Christmas in Harlem" by Kanye West from the GOOD Fridays series of releases under the GOOD Music label
 2011: "Mistletoe" by Justin Bieber from his album Under the Mistletoe
 2012: "Christmas in the Sand" by Colbie Caillat from her album of the same name; meant to conjure up (humorously) what Christmas might be like in Hawaii
 2013: "Underneath the Tree" by Kelly Clarkson on her album Wrapped in Red
 2013: "One More Sleep" by Leona Lewis on her album Christmas, with Love
 2013: "Wrapped in Red" written by Kelly Clarkson, Ashley Arrison, Aben Eubanks, and Shane McAnally and recorded by Clarkson as the opening track on her sixth studio album, Wrapped in Red
 2014: "That's Christmas to Me" by a cappella group Pentatonix (No. 2 Billboard 200, double platinum by RIAA)
 2014: "Santa Tell Me" by Ariana Grande on her EP Christmas Kisses
 2015: "Every Day's Like Christmas" by Kylie Minogue on her album Kylie Christmas
 2017: "Santa's Coming for Us" written by Sia and Greg Kurstin and released by Sia on Everyday Is Christmas
 2017: "Snowman" written by Sia and Greg Kurstin and released by Sia on Everyday Is Christmas

2020s

 2020 "Holiday" by Lil Nas X
 2020: "Christmas Saves the Year" a single written and recorded by Twenty One Pilots; released after a Twitch stream where lead singer Tyler Joseph played in a Fortnite tournament sponsored by Chipotle in hopes to raise money for Make-A-Wish Foundation.
 2021: "Merry Christmas" by Ed Sheeran and Elton John
 2022: Three Lions (It's Coming Home for Christmas) by Baddiel, Skinner & Lightning Seeds; due to the 2022 FIFA World Cup taking place in Qatar the tournament started in November instead of June. As a result Frank Skinner and David Baddiel recorded a new version of their iconic Three Lions song to make references to both Christmas and the success of the England Lionesses in the Women's Euro 2022.

Christmas songs from musicals
"I've Got My Love to Keep Me Warm", written by Irving Berlin, was introduced in the musical film On the Avenue by Dick Powell and Alice Faye in 1937. "White Christmas" was introduced in the film Holiday Inn (1942), while "Have Yourself a Merry Little Christmas" was from Meet Me in St. Louis (1944), and "Silver Bells" The Lemon Drop Kid (1950). The operetta Babes in Toyland (1903) featured the song "Toyland". The 1934 film adaptation, a Laurel and Hardy musical film known by alternative titles, opened with the song. Introducing Christmas-themed songs that have yet to achieve popularity, Scrooge (1970) included "Father Christmas", "December the 25th", and the Academy Award-nominated "Thank You Very Much".

"Mistletoe and Wine" was written for a 1976 musical entitled Scraps, which was an adaptation of Hans Christian Andersen's "The Little Match Girl". "Hard Candy Christmas" was written by Carol Hall for the 1982 musical, The Best Little Whorehouse in Texas, and later released by Dolly Parton as a single. Tim Burton's The Nightmare Before Christmas (1993) features Christmas-themed songs like "Making Christmas", "What's This?", "Town Meeting Song", and "Jack's Obsession".

Christmas novelty songs

Musical parodies of the season – comical or nonsensical songs performed principally for their comical effect – are often heard around Christmas. Many novelty songs employ unusual lyrics, subjects, sounds, or instrumentation, and may not even be particularly musical. The term arose in the Tin Pan Alley world of popular songwriting, with novelty songs achieving great popularity during the 1920s and 1930s.

The Christmas novelty song genre, which got its start with "I Yust Go Nuts at Christmas" written by Yogi Yorgesson and sung by him with the Johnny Duffy Trio in 1949, includes such notable titles as:

 "Jingle Bells" by the Singing Dogs was recorded in 1955 by Don Charles from Copenhagen; considered the work of Carl Weismann, it was revolutionary in its use of the latest recording technology.
 "Green Chri$tma$", a radio play parody by Stan Freberg that came out in 1958 and satirized commercial advertising.
 "I'm Gonna Spend My Christmas with a Dalek," a Doctor Who spin-off song, released in 1964 by The Go-Go's (the 1960s British band, not the later American band of the same name). Originally intended to help fuel Dalekmania, it tried to turn the sinister Daleks into another version of The Chipmunks.
 "Santa Looked a Lot Like Daddy", co-written and recorded by Buck Owens in 1965, has been covered by other country music stars, including Garth Brooks, Travis Tritt, and Brad Paisley.

In the 1970s comedic singing duo Cheech & Chong's debut single in 1971 was "Santa Claus and His Old Lady". The Kinks did "Father Christmas" in 1977, and Elmo & Patsy came out with "Grandma Got Run Over by a Reindeer" in 1979. More recent titles added to the canon include:

 "The Twelve Days of Christmas" parodies (including one by Bob and Doug McKenzie in 1982)
 "Christmas at Ground Zero" by Weird Al Yankovic (1986)
 "Rusty Chevrolet" by Da Yoopers, a parody of "Jingle Bells" (1987)
 "Christmas in Hollis", a rap single by Run–D.M.C. (1987)
 A Rubber Band Christmas – an entire album featuring traditional and popular Christmas songs played on rubber bands, staplers and other office equipment (1996)
 "Christmas Convoy", a southern rock song by Paul Brandt, a parody of the C.W. McCall song "Convoy" (2006)

Seattle radio personality Bob Rivers became nationally famous for his line of novelty Christmas songs and released five albums (collectively known as the Twisted Christmas quintilogy, after the name of Rivers' radio program, Twisted Radio) consisting entirely of Christmas parodies from 1987 to 2002. "Don't Shoot Me Santa" was released by The Killers in 2007, benefiting various AIDS charities. Christmas novelty songs can involve gallows humor and even morbid humor like that found in "Christmas at Ground Zero" and "The Night Santa Went Crazy", both by "Weird Al" Yankovic. The Dan Band released several adult-oriented Christmas songs on their 2007 album Ho: A Dan Band Christmas which included "Ho, Ho, Ho" (ho being slang for a prostitute), "I Wanna Rock You Hard This Christmas", "Please Don't Bomb Nobody This Holiday" and "Get Drunk & Make Out This Christmas".

Kristen Bell and a cappella group Straight No Chaser "teamed up to poke fun at the modern seasons greeting" with "Text Me Merry Christmas":

Text me Merry Christmas
Let me know you care
Just a word or two
Of text from you
Will remind me you’re still there

Straight No Chaser singer Randy Stine said of the song: "We wanted a Christmas song that spoke to how informal communication has become."

Juvenile

Christmas novelty songs include many sung by young teens, or performed largely for the enjoyment of a young audience. Starting with "I Saw Mommy Kissing Santa Claus" sung by 13-year-old Jimmy Boyd in 1952, a few other notable novelty songs written to parody the Christmas season and sung by young singers include:

 "I Want a Hippopotamus for Christmas" sung by 10-year-old Gayla Peevey (1953)
 "Nuttin' for Christmas" by Art Mooney and Barry Gordon, who was seven years old when he sang it (1955)
 "¿Dónde Está Santa Claus? (Where is Santa Claus?)" sung by 12-year-old Augie Rios, featuring the Mark Jeffrey Orchestra (1959)

Christmas novelty songs aimed at a young audience include:

 "All I Want for Christmas Is My Two Front Teeth", written by Donald Yetter Gardner in 1944 and introduced by Spike Jones and his City Slickers (1948)
 "I Saw Mommy Kissing Santa Claus" with music and lyrics by British songwriter Tommie Connor was first recorded by 13-year-old Jimmy Boyd in 1952, reaching No. 1 on the Billboard pop singles chart in December of that year. The Jackson 5 recorded a popular cover in 1970 with a young Michael Jackson singing lead.
 "The Chipmunk Song", written by Ross Bagdasarian Sr./David Seville and performed by Alvin and the Chipmunks (1958)
 "You're a Mean One, Mr. Grinch" originally done for the 1966 cartoon special How the Grinch Stole Christmas!; lyrics written by Dr. Seuss, music by Albert Hague, and performed by Thurl Ravenscroft
 "Snoopy's Christmas" performed by The Royal Guardsmen in 1967; a follow-up to their earlier song "Snoopy Vs. The Red Baron" recorded in 1966
 "Santa Claus Is a Black Man" by Akim and the Teddy Vann Production Company (1973)

The number of Christmas novelty songs is so vast that radio host Dr. Demento devotes an entire month of weekly two-hour episodes to the format each year, and the novelty songs receive frequent requests at radio stations across the country.

Non-Christian writers
Approximately half of the 30 best-selling Christmas songs by ASCAP members in 2015 were written by Jewish composers. Johnny Marks has three top Christmas songs, the most for any writer—"Rudolph the Red-Nosed Reindeer", "Rockin' Around the Christmas Tree", and "A Holly Jolly Christmas". By far the most recorded Christmas song is "White Christmas" by Irving Berlin (born Israel Isidore Beilin in Russia)—who also wrote "Happy Holiday"—with well over 500 versions in dozens of languages.

Others include: 
 "Let It Snow! Let It Snow! Let It Snow!" by Sammy Cahn (born Cohen) and Jule Styne (who also wrote "The Christmas Waltz" together)
 "Winter Wonderland" (composer Felix Bernard was born Felix William Bernhardt)
 "The Christmas Song (Chestnuts Roasting on an Open Fire)" by Robert Wells (born Levinson) and Mel Tormé 
 "Sleigh Ride" (lyricist Mitchell Parish was born Michael Hyman Pashelinsky in Lithuania)
 "It's the Most Wonderful Time of the Year" (composer George Wyle was born Bernard Weissman)
 "Silver Bells" by Jay Livingston (born Jacob Levinson) and Ray Evans
 "(There's No Place Like) Home for the Holidays" by Bob Allen (born Robert Allen Deitcher) and Al Stillman (born Albert Silverman)
 "I'll Be Home for Christmas" by Walter Kent (born Walter Kauffman) and Buck Ram (born Samuel). 
 "Santa Baby" by Joan Ellen Javits (Zeeman), niece of Senator Jacob Javits, and Philip Springer.
 "Baby, It's Cold Outside" by Frank Loesser
Lyricist Jerome "Jerry" Leiber and composer Mike Stoller wrote "Santa Claus Is Back in Town", which Elvis Presley debuted on his first Christmas album in 1957. "Christmas (Baby Please Come Home)" was written by Ellie Greenwich and Jeff Barry (with Phil Spector), originally for Ronnie Spector of The Ronettes. It was made into a hit by Darlene Love in 1963.

"Peace on Earth" was written by Ian Fraser, Larry Grossman, and Alan Kohan as a counterpoint to "The Little Drummer Boy" (1941) to make David Bowie comfortable recording "Peace on Earth/Little Drummer Boy" with Bing Crosby on September 11, 1977 – for Crosby's then-upcoming television special, Bing Crosby's Merrie Olde Christmas.

Adopted Christmas music

What is known as Christmas music today, coming to be associated with the holiday season in some way, has often been adopted from works initially composed for other purposes. Many tunes adopted into the Christmas canon carry no Christmas connotation at all. Some were written to celebrate other holidays and gradually came to cover the Christmas season.

 "Tempus Adest Floridum", a romantic spring carol with Latin words dating to the 13th-century Carmina Burana and a melody attested no later than 1584, became associated with Christmas after John Mason Neale set his epic ballad "Good King Wenceslas" to its melody in 1853. Neale's poem does not directly mention Christmas or the nativity but describes Bohemian Duke Wenceslas I's journey to aid a poor traveler on a cold St. Stephen's Day; that day falls on the day after Christmas and within the traditional Twelve Days of Christmas.
 "Joy to the World", with words written by Isaac Watts in 1719 and music by Lowell Mason (who in turn borrowed liberally from Handel) in 1839, was originally written anticipating the Second Coming.
 "Jingle Bells", first published under the title "One Horse Open Sleigh" in 1857, was originally associated with Thanksgiving rather than Christmas.
With a Welsh melody dating back to the sixteenth century, and English lyrics from 1862, "Deck the Halls" celebrates the pagan holiday of Yule and the New Year, but not explicitly Christmas ("Troll the ancient Yuletide carol/See the blazing Yule before us/While I tell of Yuletide treasure").

"Shchedryk", a Ukrainian tune celebrating the arrival of springtime, was adapted in 1936 with English lyrics to become the Christmas carol "Carol of the Bells" and in 1995 as the heavy-metal instrumental "Christmas Eve/Sarajevo 12/24." "When You Wish Upon a Star", an Academy Award-winning song about dreams, hope, and magic featured in Walt Disney's Pinocchio (1940). What later became the main theme for Disney studios was sung by Cliff Edwards, who voiced Jiminy Cricket in the film. In Scandinavian countries and Japan, the song is used in reference to the Star of Bethlehem and the "ask, and it will be given to you" discourse in Matthew 7:7–8; in the movie it is in reference to the Blue Fairy.

Many popular Christmas tunes of the 20th-century mention winter imagery, leading to their being adopted into the Christmas and holiday season. These include:

 "Winter Wonderland" (1934)
 "I've Got My Love to Keep Me Warm" (1937)
 "Baby, It's Cold Outside" (1944)
 "A Marshmallow World" (1949)
 "Jingle Bell Rock" (1957)
 "My Favorite Things" (1959)

"Do You Want to Build a Snowman?" (2013), from the movie Frozen, features lyrics that are more of an illustration of the relationship between the two main characters than a general description of winter or the holidays, but its title rhetoric and the winter imagery used throughout the film have led it to be considered a holiday song.

Quite the contrary, "Sleigh Ride", composed originally in 1948 as an instrumental by Leroy Anderson, was inspired by a heatwave in Connecticut. The song premiered with the Boston Pops Orchestra in May 1948 with no association with Christmas. The lyrics added in 1950 have "nothing to do with Santa, Jesus, presents or reindeer," but the jingling bells and "sleigh" in the title made it a natural Christmas song. Lyricist Sammy Cahn and composer Jule Styne also found themselves in a heatwave in July 1945 when they wrote "Let It Snow! Let It Snow! Let It Snow!", inserting no reference to Christmas in the song. "Holiday" (2010) is about the summer holidays, but has been used in some Christmas ad campaigns.

Perry Como famously sang Franz Schubert's setting of "Ave Maria" in his televised Christmas special each year, including the song on The Perry Como Christmas Album (1968). The song, a prayer to the Virgin Mary sung in Latin, would become a "staple of family holiday record collections." American a capella group Pentatonix released their version of "Hallelujah", the 1984 song written by Leonard Cohen and covered famously by a number of acts, on their Christmas album shortly before the songwriter's death in 2016. Besides the title, and several biblical references, the song contains no connection to Christmas or the holidays per se. Various versions have been added to Christmas music playlists on radio stations in the United States and Canada.

In the United Kingdom, songs not explicitly tied to Christmas are popularly played during the year-end holidays. "Stop the Cavalry", written and performed by English musician Jona Lewie in 1980, was intended as a war protest. The line "Wish I was at home for Christmas" with brass band arrangements styled it as an appropriate song to play in the Christmas season. Children's songs such as "Mr Blobby" (No. 1, 1993) and the theme from Bob the Builder (No. 1, 2000), novelty songs such as Benny Hill's "Ernie" (No. 1, 1971) and South Park'''s "Chocolate Salty Balls" (No. 2, 1998), and "He Ain't Heavy, He's My Brother" from an ensemble of Liverpudlian celebrities in commemoration of the 1989 Hillsborough Disaster (No. 1, 2012) are often heard around Christmas.

Radio broadcasting of Christmas music

In the United States, it is common for local radio stations to gradually begin adding Christmas music to their regular playlists in late-November, typically after Thanksgiving (which is generally considered the official start of the holiday season), and sometimes culminating with all-Christmas music by Christmas itself. More prominently, some stations temporarily drop their regular music format entirely and switch exclusively to Christmas music for the holiday season. The latter practice became more widespread in 2001 after the September 11 attacks, as a means of helping improve the morale of listeners.

Although there is a chance that a station's normal audience may be alienated by a switch to all-Christmas music (adult contemporary, country music, and oldies audiences are generally the most accepting), these risks are outweighed by the increase in ratings that such a shift can attract. There is also a chance that after they return to regular programming, a station may be able to retain some of this expanded audience as new, regular listeners.

Arbitron (now Nielsen Audio) reported in 2011 that it was not uncommon for a station's average audience to double after switching to Christmas music, citing several large-market stations in 2010 such as Boston's WODS, Los Angeles's KOST, New York's WLTW, and San Diego's KYXY. In 2017, Chicago's WLIT-FM roughly quadrupled its audience share between November (2.8) and December (12.4) after making the switch. The practice may not always transition well into financial success, since advertisers do not universally recognize Nielsen's holiday ratings book.

In some markets, there may be one dominant broadcaster of Christmas music, but this is not always the case. Perceiving a competitive advantage in being the first in a market to begin playing Christmas music, it is not uncommon for some stations to adopt the format prior to Thanksgiving, or even as early as late-October. The practice has been considered an example of Christmas creep. In an extreme example of Christmas creep, at least one station in 2020 (WWIZ in the Mahoning Valley) flipped to Christmas music in late September, exactly three full months before Christmas; the same station had also been first in the nation in 2019, but had begun two months before Christmas that year, on October 25. WWIZ was the first of many stations in the United States that had flipped to Christmas especially early in 2020, in part to alleviate stress caused by the COVID-19 pandemic.

As many Christmas songs contain themes strongly associated with Christmas Day (such as references to figures such as Santa Claus), and popular observance of the Christmas season often ends after December 25 (in contrast to the traditional Twelve Days of Christmas, which by definition runs until Epiphany on January 6), most stations typically end their all-Christmas programming at some point on December 25 or 26. However, it is not uncommon for stations to continue to play at least some Christmas music through the weekend following Christmas, or even through New Year's Day (particularly when stunting in anticipation of a format change). Radio stations will also adjust their playlists throughout the Christmas season; songs that are less readily tolerated for repeated listenings, such as novelty songs, are seldom played in November and only get mixed into the playlist closer to Christmas as a change of pace.

As a stunt format
Christmas music is a popular stunt format for radio stations, either as a "Christmas in July" promotion, or as a buffer period for transitioning from one format to another.

The end of a calendar year is a common time period for format switches, often following an all-Christmas format (either immediately, or with a second stunt occurring directly afterward). However, the transition itself can still occur before the end of the holiday season, such as the sudden transition of country station KMPS in Seattle to soft adult contemporary KSWD, after briefly playing an all-Christmas format following the merger of CBS Radio and Entercom (due to redundancy with sister station KKWF).

Playing Christmas music outside of the holiday season, or otherwise implying that the format is permanent, is a more obvious stunt. In April 2008, the new radio station CFWD-FM in Saskatoon soft launched with an all-Christmas format in preparation for the station's official launch as a top 40 station. In an extreme case, adult hits station WJSR in Lakeside/Richmond, Virginia maintained a Christmas music format from October 13, 2020, all the way through March 4, 2021, after which it flipped to classic hits; the station had stunted from the beginning of October as "Short Attention Span Radio" before switching to Christmas music.

Outside the United States
With the growth in digital broadcasting platforms around the world, the opportunity to offer thematic radio formats on a pop-up basis has increased.

In Ireland, a temporary radio station named Christmas FM broadcasts on a temporary license in Dublin and Cork from November 28 to December 26, solely playing Christmas music.

In the UK, the Festive Fifty list of songs as voted for by listeners is broadcast starting on Christmas Day, originally by DJ John Peel, and nowadays by Internet radio station Dandelion Radio.

Since the early 2010s, a number of Christmas music stations have broadcast on national and local digital platforms in the United Kingdom, with some also being carried on the FM band. These have included:
 Smooth Christmas, launched by the then-owner of Smooth Radio, Guardian Media Group, on national Digital One DAB in November/December 2011, with the slot used after Christmas by Smooth 70s. The Christmas station returned around the same timeframe of 2012 with this space taken over after Christmas by Bauer Radio station Kiss. Following the acquisition of Smooth by Global and the addition of Capital Xtra to national DAB in October 2013, there was not capacity available for Smooth Christmas to run in 2013, but the service was revived by Global to run in 2014 and 2015 before being superseded by Heart extra Christmas on DAB in subsequent years; the name Smooth Christmas has since been revived as a seasonal pop-up stream within the online Global Player service, playing melodic Christmas hits. Several other streams, such as 'Classic FM Christmas' playing thematically-appropriate classical music, have also appeared on Global Player at the relevant time of year.
 Heart extra Christmas / Heart Christmas – Following the launch of national digital station Heart extra in February 2016, Global would annually flip that service to playing continuous Christmas music during November and December of each year. The service broadcast in mono using the older DAB standard in 2016, 2017 and 2018; following the transition of Heart extra to broadcast in stereo using the DAB+format earlier in 2019, Heart extra Christmas ran in that format in 2019. Following the cancellation of Heart extra in favour of Heart UK on national DAB+ in 2020, Heart Christmas ran from October 2020 as a discrete station at the local tier, broadcast in DAB+ in the London area and in standard DAB in a number of other locations, as well as being available nationwide online.
 Pulse Christmas / Signal Christmas / The Wave Christmas - in 2014, Wireless Group (then under the control of UTV Radio) made use of available DAB capacity in three of its FM broadcast areas to launch temporary Christmas stations co-branded with the local FM station names: Pulse Christmas in Bradford/Huddersfield, Signal Christmas in Stoke-on-Trent, and The Wave Christmas in Swansea/southwest Wales. The stations ran annually, appearing each November/December between 2014 and 2019 but ceased thereafter due to the acquisition of Wireless local stations by Bauer Radio in 2019 and the absorption of these services into Bauer's Hits Radio and Greatest Hits Radio in 2020. In addition, in 2016 and 2017, Wireless additionally ran a similar pop-up Christmas music station, Scottish Sun Christmas, on regional DAB in central Scotland.
 Nation Xmas – Nation Broadcasting ran a Christmas station on DAB in several areas of Wales in November/December 2015, and following the festive pop-up these slots were taken by Nation Gold (now Dragon Radio Wales).
 Magic Christmas / Magic 100% Christmas - Bauer Radio launched this station, a subsidiary of its main Magic station, on national Digital One DAB in late 2017, taking over a slot Bauer had been holding since the summer with Kiss Fresh. (After Christmas this slot was taken up by Absolute Radio 90s, with Kisstory occupying the slot since February 2019.) During December 2018 and 2019, rather than launching a standalone Christmas station Bauer instead flipped the playlist of the main Magic service – available on 105.4 FM in London in addition to broadcasting nationally on DAB – to Christmas music. In 2020, Bauer launched an online Christmas music stream, as Magic 100% Christmas, through its websites and apps in August, before flipping the main Magic service to play principally Christmas music from November 25. In addition, in December 2018, Bauer launched a temporary Christmas music service, Greatest Hits Christmas, broadcast on 105.2 FM in Birmingham and The Black Country during the period leading up to the relaunch of the frequency as Greatest Hits Radio in January 2019; GHC played Christmas music with announcements regarding the impending new station launch, and information for listeners to the service previously carried on 105.2 FM - Absolute Radio - as to how they could regain access to Absolute by retuning to a digital platform. GHC was not itself broadcast on digital services.
 MincePie NonStop – run by UKRD as a sibling service to York FM/DAB station Minster FM, this station was initially an online-only service, being made available on DAB in 2017, 2018 and 2019 but did not return in 2020 due to the acquisition of UKRD's stations by Bauer Radio, with the conversion of Minster FM to Greatest Hits Radio York and North Yorkshire. UKRD also ran a pop-up Christmas station in Cornwall, Pirate Christmas – a sibling to Pirate FM – on DAB in 2018 and 2019, freeing space for this with a reduction in the broadcast bitrate of Pirate FM and its sibling services. Although MincePie NonStop no longer broadcasts, listeners in North Yorkshire were able to access a locally programmed Christmas station on DAB in 2020 with community service YorkMix launching XmasMix on the local digital multiplex.
 Several other smaller services have appeared on individual local DAB platforms in recent times, either popping up as self-contained stations (such as Radio Marsden Christmas, which ran in Surrey in 2015 and 2017) or as a temporary rebranding of an existing regular station (such as Sandgrounder Radio temporarily renaming as 'Santagrounder' on DAB in 2016 and 2017).

Christmas music on satellite and internet radio
Outside of traditional AM/FM radio, satellite radio provider SiriusXM typically devotes multiple channels to different genres of Christmas music during the holiday season. Numerous Internet radio services also offer Christmas music channels, some of them available year-round. Citadel Media produced The Christmas Channel, a syndicated 24-hour radio network, during the holiday season in past years (though in 2010, Citadel instead included Christmas music on its regular Classic Hits network). Music Choice offers nonstop holiday music to its digital cable, cable modem, and mobile phone subscribers between November 1 and New Year's Day on its "Sounds of the Seasons" (traditional), "R&B" (soul), "Tropicales" (Latin), and "Soft Rock" (contemporary) channels, as well as a year-round "All Christmas" channel. DMX provides holiday music as part of its SonicTap music service for digital cable and DirecTV subscribers, as does Dish Network via its in-house Dish CD music channels. Services such as Muzak also distribute Christmas music to retail stores for use as in-store background music during the holidays.

The growing popularity of Internet radio has inspired other media outlets to begin offering Christmas music. In 2009 Phoenix television station KTVK launched four commercial-free online radio stations including Ho Ho Radio, which streams Christmas music throughout the month of December.

iHeartRadio also has two-year-round stations that are dedicated to Christmas music. One station, iHeart Christmas, focuses on more contemporary holiday music, while the other, iHeart Christmas Classics, offers seasonal music from past decades.

See also

 
 Best-selling Christmas/holiday singles in the United States
 List of Christmas calypsos
 List of Christmas carols
 List of Christmas hit singles in the United Kingdom
 List of Christmas hit singles in the United States
 List of best-selling Christmas/holiday albums in the United States
 Billboard Christmas Holiday Charts
 Villancico

References

Further reading
 "Seasonal Songs With Twang, Funk and Harmony", The New York Times, November 26, 2010.
 Stories Behind The Best-Loved Songs of Christmas by Ace Collins, 160 pages, 2004.
 The International Book of Christmas Carols by W. Ehret and G. K. Evans, Stephen Greene Press, Vermont, 1980.
 Victorian Songs and Music by Olivia Bailey, Caxton Publishing, 2002.
 Spirit of Christmas: A History of Our Best-Loved Carols by Virginia Reynolds and Lesley Ehlers, 2000.
 Christmas Music Companion Fact Book by Dale V. Nobbman, 2000.
 Joel Whitburn presents Christmas in the charts, 1920–2004 by Joel Whitburn, 2004.
 Angels We Have Heard: The Christmas Song Stories'' by James Richliano, 2002.

External links

 
 

 
 
 
Lists of songs
Radio formats